John Fogarty (born 18 October 1977) is an Irish rugby union former player who is now scrum coach for Ireland. During his playing career, in which he played as a hooker, Fogarty for three of the four Irish provincial teams; Munster, Connacht and Leinster. At international level, Fogarty played for Ireland A and Ireland.

Playing career
Fogarty hails from Tipperary and was educated in Rockwell College. Fogarty enjoyed a two-year spell with Munster, from 2000 to 2002, and after moving teams, made 107 appearances for the Connacht. He played 80 times in the Celtic League and 27 times in the European Challenge Cup since his debut in the 2003–04 season. Fogarty captained Connacht for the 2006–07 Celtic League and Challenge Cup. Fogarty left Connacht for Leinster ahead of the 2008–09 season.

He was called up to the Ireland squad for the 2010 tour of New Zealand and Australia and earned his first test cap as a replacement in the 75th minute against the All Blacks on 12 June 2010. He was also part of an Ireland XV to play the New Zealand Māori team.

Fogarty announced his retirement in November 2010. He had been advised by doctors to do so, due to having suffered repeated concussions.

Coaching career
After retirement Fogarty became an Elite Player Development Officer with the province, working with the Leinster ‘A’ and also fulfilling the role of scrum coach with the Ireland Under-20s.

He was appointed as Leinster scrum coach in June 2015.

References

External links
Munster Profile
Leinster Profile
Ireland Profile
Ireland A Profile
Robin McBryde

1977 births
Living people
Irish rugby union coaches
Irish rugby union players
Ireland international rugby union players
Leinster Rugby players
Munster Rugby players
Connacht Rugby players
Rugby union hookers
People educated at Rockwell College
Rugby union players from County Cork
Leinster Rugby non-playing staff
Ireland Wolfhounds international rugby union players